Harold Arthur "Arch" Dickens (19 June 1903 – 25 May 1996) was an Australian rules footballer who played with Fitzroy and Melbourne in the Victorian Football League (VFL).

Dickens was recruited from Preston. He played on a wing for Fitzroy in their 1923 VFL Grand Final loss to Essendon. He was one of the last players to use the place kick when kicking for goal.

References

External links

 
 Demonwiki profile

1903 births
1996 deaths
Australian rules footballers from Melbourne
Australian Rules footballers: place kick exponents
Fitzroy Football Club players
Melbourne Football Club players
Preston Football Club (VFA) players
People from Preston, Victoria